Valdiviathyris is a genus of craniate brachiopods that has changed little since the Silurian, from when fossils are known. The extant species V. quenstedti is known from the late Eocene. The specimen is considered to be adolescent and has a thin (0.1 mm thick) calcareous dorsal valve. This has an irregular conical shape, with the tip (or apex) not coinciding with the middle, and is on the outside only adorned by growth lines. On the inside it has pits (or punctae) that branch into four or five canals further to the outside. More recent specimens have been found near New Zealand. As long as no fossils of Vadiviathyris are found dating between the Silurian and the Eocene, this genus can be regarded a Lazarus taxon.

References

Craniata
Brachiopod genera
Extant Silurian first appearances
Pridoli genus first appearances